Daniel Alejandro Franco (born 15 July 1991) is an Argentine footballer who plays for Atlético Grau.

References

1991 births
Living people
Argentine footballers
Argentine expatriate footballers
Association football defenders
Argentinos Juniors footballers
Club Almagro players
San Martín de San Juan footballers
Club Atlético Brown footballers
Sud América players
Club Atlético Los Andes footballers
Curicó Unido footballers
Oriente Petrolero players
Argentine Primera División players
Uruguayan Primera División players
Primera B Metropolitana players
Primera Nacional players
Chilean Primera División players
Bolivian Primera División players
Argentine expatriate sportspeople in Uruguay
Argentine expatriate sportspeople in Chile
Argentine expatriate sportspeople in Bolivia
Expatriate footballers in Uruguay
Expatriate footballers in Chile
Sportspeople from Santa Fe Province